Camozzi is a surname. Notable people with the surname include:

Agostina Camozzi (1435-1458), Italian Roman Catholic nun
Brian Camozzi (born 1991), American mixed martial artist
Chris Camozzi (born 1986), American kickboxer and mixed martial artist 
Ivano Camozzi (born 1962), Italian alpine skier